The men's single sculls was one of four rowing events on the Rowing at the 1908 Summer Olympics programme. Nations could enter up to 2 boats (total of 2 rowers). Nine rowers from six nations competed. The host nation, Great Britain, earned the top two spots with Harry Blackstaffe taking gold and Alexander McCulloch silver. It was the first victory in the event for Great Britain, which had taken bronze in 1900. The two bronze medals went to semifinalists Bernhard von Gaza of Germany and Károly Levitzky of Hungary, both nations making their debut in the event.

Background

This was the third appearance of the event. Rowing had been on the programme in 1896 but was cancelled due to bad weather. The single sculls has been held every time that rowing has been contested, beginning in 1900.

For the first time, there was a strong international field. The Diamond Challenge Sculls winners competing were Lou Scholes of Great Britain (1904), Harry Blackstaffe of Great Britain (1906), and Alexander McCulloch of Canada (1908). Great Britain had another strong sculler in London for the Games in Frederick Septimus Kelly (1902, 1903, and 1905 Diamond champion), but he had retired from sculling and competed in the eight instead; only two of the British rowers would have been able to compete under the 1908 national limits in any case. Prominent American sculler Frank Greer, the reigning Olympic champion, did not compete.

Belgium, Canada, Germany, Hungary, and Italy each made their debut in the event. Great Britain was the only nation to have competed before, making its second appearance.

Competition format

The 1908 tournament featured four rounds of one-on-one races; with 9 boats in the competition, 7 had byes to the quarterfinals and only 1 race was held in the first round. Semifinal losers each received bronze medals. The course was 1.5 miles in length, with two slight bends near the start and about halfway.

Schedule

Results

First round

Heat 1

Von Gaza won easily, and Killer abandoned the race after the German crossed the finish line.

Quarterfinals

Quarterfinal 1

Quarterfinal 2

Quarterfinal 3
Bowler capsized, leaving Blackstaffe with the win.

Quarterfinal 4

Semifinals

Semifinal 1

Semifinal 2

von Gaza fell ill at the 1500m mark, leaving Blackstaffe to ease off and win.

Final

McCulloch took the early lead, but started by pulling fewer strokes than Blackstaffe. McCulloch opened up by a length and led through 1200 yards before being caught by Blackstaffe. At 1 mile, Blackstaffe pulled ahead by ¾ of a length and held this lead to the finish.

Results summary

References

External links
 
 

Men's sculls 1